Xavier Veilhan (1963) is a French artist who works with photography, sculpture, film, painting and installation art.

Education
Veilhan attended the École nationale supérieure des arts décoratifs in Paris, followed by the Berlin University of the Arts, where he worked in the studio of Georg Baselitz. He finished his studies at the Institut des hautes études en arts plastiques in 1989.

Career

Veilhan works with a wide range of media: sculpture, installation, painting, photography, performance work, and filmmaking. He experiments with the idea of the generic within industrialism and universal representations. He has represented France at the Taipei Biennial in 2002; the International Biennial of Graphic Arts in Ljubljana and the Lyon Biennale in 2003; the Valencia Biennale in 2005; and the Venice Biennale in 2017. He has also presented at the 2010 World Expo in Shanghai. He also has a number of permanent public installations, including Le Lion (2005) in Bordeaux; Deux Pingouins, Grand Pingouin, Jeune Fille en roller, Le Livreur de pizza, Ours, and Home au téléphone (2006) in Lyon's  Cité internationale neighbourhood; Jean-Marc Bustamente (2012) in Manhattan, La Crocodile (Olivier Mosset) in Lausanne and Romy and the dogs at the MAAT in Lisbon in 2019; and Romy (2022) at the Lille-Flandres station.

A number of books have been written about or have included his work, including by writers Jean-Pierre Criqui (1990), Éric Troncy and Liam Gillick (1991), Dan Cameron, Gillick, Alison M. Gingeras, and John Miller (2000), Gingeras and Christine Macel (2004), Jean-Jacques Aillagon, Criqui, Laurent Le Bon, Arnauld Pierre, and Pierre Senges (2009), and Andrew Berardini and Yuko Hasegawa (2015).

Selected exhibitions

Veilhan's art has been exhibited at venues such as Fundació Joan Miró, Barbican Centre, Kitakyushu Center for Contemporary Art, and the Gering & López Gallery.

Solo exhibitions
{| class="wikitable sortable"
! Year(s) !! Title !! Venue !! class="unsortable"| Ref
|-
| 2003 || Keep the Brown || Sandra Gering Gallery || 
|-
| 2004 || Vanishing Point || Espace 315 at Centre Pompidou; Écuries de Saint-Hugues, Musée de Cluny ||
|-
| rowspan="2" | 2005 || Le Plein emploi || Strasbourg Museum of Modern and Contemporary Art || 
|-
| Le Projet Hyperréaliste || Rose Art Museum ||
|-
| rowspan="3" | 2006 || Les Habitants || Cité internationale in Lyon ||
|-
| Miami Snowflakes || Galerie Perrotin in Miami ||
|-
| Sculptures automatiques || Galerie Perrotin in Paris
|-
| 2008 || Furtivo || Pinacoteca Giovanni e Marella Agnelli || 
|-
| 2009 || Veilhan Versailles || Palace of Versailles || 
|-
| rowspan="2" | 2010 || RAL 5015 || Artcurial || 
|-
| Le Carrosse || Place de la République || 
|-
| rowspan="2" | 2012 || Veilhan at Hatfield: Promenade || Hatfield House ||
|-
| (IN)balance || The Phillips Collection || 
|-
| rowspan="2" | 2013 || Avant || Château de Rentilly || 
|-
| Mobiles || Galerie Perrotin in Hong Kong || 
|-
| rowspan="4" | 2014 || Maquettes]] || Frac Centre ||
|-
| On/off || Galerie des Galeries || 
|-
| Architectones || Maison Melnikov in Moscow || 
|-
| Les 30 Ans de Canal+: L'Expo || Palais de Tokyo || 
|-
| 2015 || Music || Galerie Perrotin in New York City || 
|-
| 2019 || PLUS QUE PIERRE || Collégiale-Saint-Martin & FRAC des Pays de la Loire 
|-
| rowspan="2" | 2021 || Autofocus || Galerie Perrotin in New York City || 
|-
| Chemin Vert || Perrotin Tokyo ||
|-
| rowspan="2" | 2022 || Dessins de confinement || Perrotin Viewing Room ||
|-
| M O V I N G || Galerie Andréhn-Schiptjenko in Paris ||
|}

Group exhibitions

Selected films
As a director, Veilhan has worked on:
 2002: Le Film du Japon 2003: Drumball 2005: Cruiser 2008: Radiator - in collaboration with Michael Elion
 2008: Furtivo 
 2010: L'affaire Dreyfus 2011: Pendule Dripping 2015: Vent Moderne 2015: Matching Numbers''

References

 

French photographers
1963 births
Living people
20th-century French painters
20th-century French male artists
French male painters
21st-century French painters
21st-century French male artists
French conceptual artists
French contemporary artists
20th-century French sculptors
French male sculptors
French mixed-media artists